Pancharatra (IAST: Pāñcarātra) was a religious movement in Hinduism that originated in late 3rd-century BCE around the ideas of Narayana and the various avatars of Vishnu as their central deities. The movement later merged with the ancient Bhagavata tradition and contributed to the development of Vaishnavism. The Pancharatra movement created numerous literary treatises in Sanskrit called the Pancharatra Samhitas, and these have been influential Agamic texts within the theistic Vaishnava movements.

Literally meaning five nights (pañca: five, rātra: nights), the term Pancharatra has been variously interpreted. The term has been attributed to a sage Narayana who performed a sacrifice for five nights and became a transcendent being and one with all beings. The Pancharatra Agamas constitute some of the most important texts of many Vaishnava philosophies including the Madhva Sampradaya or Brahma Sampradaya of Madhvacharya and the Sri Vaishnava Sampradaya of Ramanuja. The Pancharatra Agamas are composed of more than 200 texts; likely composed between 600 CE to 850 CE.

The Shandilya Sutras (~100 CE) is the earliest known text that systematized the devotional Bhakti pancharatra doctrine and 2nd-century CE inscriptions in South India suggest Pancharatra doctrines were known there by then. The 8th-century Adi Shankara criticized elements of the Pancharatra doctrine along with other theistic approaches stating Pancaratra doctrine was against monistic spiritual pursuits and non-Vedic. The 11th-century Ramanuja, the influential Vaishnavism scholar, developed a qualified monism doctrine which bridged ideas of Pancharatra movement and those of monistic ideas in the Vedas. The Pancharatra theology is a source of the primary and secondary avatar-related doctrines in traditions of Hinduism.

History
Pancharatra has likely roots in 3rd-century BCE, as a religious movement around the ideas of a sage Narayana who is an avatar of Vishnu.

The earliest use of the word Pancharatra is found in section 7.1.10 of the Taittiriya Samhita, a Vedic text. The section describes a person going through a Pancharatra ritual to become a master of rhetorics. The section 13.6 of the Śatapatha Brāhmaṇa mentions Nārāyaṇa as the primordial divinity who performs this offering. The Narayaniya section of the Mahabharata (XII, 335–351) refers to seven rishis who say the Pancharatra ritual was made consistent with the Vedas. Though the five day ritual is mentioned along with many other sacrifices in the Vedic text, the origins of Pancaratra devotees of Vishnu and their tradition is unclear. The movement merged with the ancient Bhagavata tradition also around Krishna-Vāsudeva, and contributed to the development of Vaishnavism.

According to J. A. B. van Buitenen, the word "Pancharatra" is explained in Naradiya Samhita as referring to a tradition of "five knowledges". Similarly, Jan Gonda states that the term "nights" in "five nights" in the Pancharatra tradition may be a metaphor for inner darkness, and "came to mean – how, we do not know", though indeed there have been many interpretations such as "five systems", "five studies" and "five rituals".

The 1st-century works by Shandilya are the earliest known systematization of the Pancharatra doctrine. This doctrine was known and influential around then, as is attested by the 2nd-century CE inscriptions in South India. Evidence suggests that they co-existed with the Bhagavata tradition in ancient times.

The Advaita Vedanta scholars, such as Adi Shankara, criticized elements of the Pancharatra doctrine along with other theistic approaches stating it was against monastic spiritual pursuits and non-Vedic. According to Suthren Hirst, Shankara supported the use of icons and temple worship if it focussed as a means to comprehend Brahman as the sole metaphysical reality. However, he opposed devotional theism as an end in itself and the goal of spiritual pursuits. The Pancharatra tradition has historically disagreed with claims of it being non-Vedic, states Gonda, and Pancharatra texts explicitly state that, "Pancharatra is Vedic, it originates in the Sruti" and that the "Pancharatra precepts and practices should be observed by anyone who has allegiance to the Vedas".

The 11th-century Ramanuja, the influential Sri Vaishnavism scholar, was born in Pancharatra tradition, disagreed with Shankara, and developed a qualified monism doctrine which integrated ideas of Pancharatra movement and those of monistic ideas in the Vedas. Ramanuja stated that the Vishnu of Pancharatra is identical to Vedanta's Brahman, where Purusha reflects the eternal soul that is Vishnu, and Prakriti the impermanent ever changing body of Vishnu.

Vishnu worshipers of today, represented in a wide spectrum of traditions, generally follow the system of Pancharatra worship. The concept of Naḍa and Naḍa-Brahman appear already in Sāttvata Samhita or Sāttvata Tantra and in Jayākhya Samhita, two texts considered most canonical of Pancharatra texts.

Ānanda Tīrtha the founder of Madhva line has written in his commentary on Mundaka Upanishad:

"In Dvapara Yuga, Vishnu is exclusively worshiped according to the principles of the Pancharatra Scripture, but in this age of Kali Yuga, the Supreme Lord Hari is worshiped only by the chanting of his Holy Name."

Jiva Gosvami had stated in his Paramātma Sandārbha, forming part of six principal Sandārbhas, or philosophical treatises of Gaudiya Vaishnavism, that, "Seeing that the imperfect scriptures in the modes of passion and ignorance bring only a host of troubles, and also seeing that the original Vedas are very difficult to follow properly, and thus being very dissatisfied with both of these, the all-knowing scripture authors affirm the superiority of the Pancharatras, which describe the pure absolute truth, Narayana, and the worship of the Lord, which is very easy to perform."

Divine Manifestation

The Pancharatra theology developed over time. It presents a dualistic theory on how creation manifested from a godhead, as the Purusha-Prakriti and as the masculine-feminine manifestations of the divine. It states that the creation emerged through vyuhas (arrangements). In the beginning, states Pancharatra doctrine, there was only Vāsudeva-Krishna (Vishnu-Narayana, Vāsudeva literally means "indwelling deity") as the highest changeless god. It arranged into Saṅkarṣaṇa (Balarama) as the lord over all life, then Pradyumna creating mind, and Aniruddha as ego (ahamkara). Thereafter, Brahma emerged from Aniruddha who created the empirical universe. Thus, the divinity was and is everywhere in Pancaratra, but in different aspects, one form or phase emerging from the previous.

During the 11th century CE Ramanuja, a founder of Sri Vaishnava traditions of Vaisnavism had established the Pancharatra system of Vaisnavism for his followers. His philosophy of worship of Narayana was based on the pancaratric teachings.

Ramanuja taught that the deity absolute, Parabrahman, manifests in five possible aspects: Para, Vyuha, Vibhava, Antaryamin, and Archa. Living beings can interact with the divine through one or another of these five:

Para: the invisible,  eternal supreme ;
Vyuha: the invisible, impermanent supreme in form;
Vibhava: also called the Avatharam, are the incarnations of the supreme in various yuga (eras in Hindu cosmology) such as the Dashavatara;
Antaryamin: not directly perceptible but can be inferred, the aspect of supreme whose presence can be felt by the devotee;
Archa: visible icon form, filled with symbolism, consecrated in temples or revered images inside home (Shalagrama, conch shell, festive decorations), a means to remember and meditate on the supreme.
To worship Lord in temples- The ancient civilization systematically developed cities, towns and villages according to the scriptures written with Vedic knowledge and build temples to consecrate the Idol of lord and prescribed the rules to worship, offering, to do festivals by bring people together from all walks of life with all civic sense.  Interestingly, while doing festivals the scriptures insist clean environment and maintaining of medical, stay  and food facilities for pilgrimage visit the festival

Influence
The Vyuha-related Pancharatra theology is a source of the primary and secondary avatar-related doctrines in traditions of Hinduism, particularly Sri Vaishnavism. According to Barbara Holdrege, a professor and comparative historian of religions, the Pancharatra doctrines influenced both Sri Vaishnavism and Gaudiya Vaishnavism, albeit a bit different. In Sri Vaishnavism, Vishnu-Narayana is supreme, while Vāsudeva, Samkarsana, Pradyumna and Aniruddha are the four Vyuhas. In Gaudiya Vaishnavism, the Vyuha theory is more complex, Krishna (Vāsudeva) is "Svayam Bhagavan" (the ultimate or Para Brahman) who manifests as Vyuhas, and he along with Samkarsana, Pradyumna and Aniruddha are the Vyuhas and the Purusha-avataras of the material realm.

Practices

The Pancharatra tradition taught the Panchakala or five observances practiced every day:
 Abhigamna or ablutions and morning prayers to god.
 Upadana or collecting worship materials.
 Ijya or worship with offerings. 
 Svadhyaya or daily study.
 Yoga and meditation.

The significance of divine manifestation theology in Pancaratra tradition is it believes that an understanding of the process by which Vishnu-Narayana emerged into empirical reality and human beings, can lead one to reverse the process. Through practicing the reversal and moving from the empirical to ever more abstract, according to Pancaratra, human beings can access immanent Vāsudeva-Krishna and thereby achieve salvific liberation (moksha).

Temples
The Vaishnava temples and arts since the Gupta Empire, states Doris Srinivasan, attempted to present the Pancaratra ideas. In this system, states Srinivasan, "Vāsudeva, literally, "the indwelling deity," is the first emanation and the fountainhead of the successive emanations, which may be represented either anthropomorphically or theriomorphically in Hindu art". As one circumambulates the ancient and medieval Vaishnava cave temples, the devotee walks past from the icon representing Vāsudeva (most abstract) and then the successive Vyuhas (literally, "orderly arrangement").

Pancharatra Texts 
The Bhaktisūtras of Shandilya were one of the earliest systematic treatises on the Pancaratra doctrine. The Pancaratra literature constitutes the Āgama texts of Vaishnavism. Like the Shaivism counterpart, it not only presents the theology, but describes the details, symbolism and procedures of Vaishnava temples building and rituals. According to the Pancharatra tradition, there are 108 samhitas, but its texts list over 200 samhitas. Many Pancaratra texts have been lost. Some surviving Pancaratra texts, with their general focus, are:
Sasvata Samhita: treatise on divine manifestations (vyuhas), fourthy six incarnations of Vishnu, and worship methodology
Ahirbudhnya Samhita: discusses philosophy, vyuha theory, alphabet and rituals
Hayashirsha Samhita: rituals and deities
Padma Samhita: Panchakala practices for the devotee, festivals and mantras
Paushkara Samhita: iconography and worship, believed to be a gem along with Satvata Samhita
Maha Sanatkumara Samhita: a large text on religious practice
Isvara Samhita: meditation, worship and rituals.

List of agamas
The Pancharatra texts are samhitas and tantras which both classify as Agama due to subject matter. The Agamas are predominantly divided into Saiva, Sakta and Vaishnava Agamas. The Vaishnava Agamas are Pancharatra Agama and Vaikhanasa Agama and they conclude Brahman as Narayana or Vishnu. The Mahabharata subscribes to the Pancharatra philosophy in its Narayaniya section. Author  Vishnulok Bihari Srivastava says, "Pancharatra has been discussed in the Narayanopakhyana section of Mahabharata. It has been mentioned that Narada had imbibed the essence of this tantra from the Saint Narayana. It has been accepted as part of Veda named Ekayana. As many as 215 Pancharatra Samhitas have been mentioned in Kapinjala Samhita". Some of the Samhita's are, a list mainly based on the list of the Sanskrit texts from the H. Daniel Smith Agama Collection, Cleveland, Ohio:

 Agastya-Samhita
 Aniruddha-Samhita
 Ahirbudhnya Samhita
 Brihat-Brahma-Samhita
 Isvara-Samhita
 Kapinjala-Samhita
 Gautama-Samhita
 Citrasikhandi-Samhita
 Jayakhya-Samhita
 Jayottara-Samhita
 Nalakubara-Samhita
 Naradiya-Samhita
 Pancaprasna-Samhita
 Parama-Samhita
 Paramapurusa-Samhita
 Parasara-Samhita
 Padma-Samhita
 Paramesvara-Samhita
 Prakasa-Samhita
 Purusottama-Samhita
 Pauskara-Samhita
 Bharadvaja-Samhita
 Bhargava-Tantra
 Mayavaibhava-Samhita
 Markandeya-Samhita
 Laksmi Tantra
 Varaha-Samhita
 Vasistha-Samhita
 Visva-Samhita
 Visvamitra-Samhita
 Visnutattva-Samhita
 Visnu Tantra
 Visnu-Samhita
 Visvaksena-Samhita
 Vihagendra-Samhita
 Vrddha-Padma-Samhita
 Sriprasna-Samhita
 Sanatkumara-Samhita
 SattvatSamhita
 Shesha-Samhita
 Hayasirsa-Samhita

Of these Samhitas in Srirangam Sri Ranganatha Swamy temple "Sri Paramesvara Samhita", a variant of paushkara samhita is followed and in practice.

In Sri Kanchipuram Varadaraja Swamy temple "Sri Jayakhya Samhita" is followed and in practice. In Sri Melukote Cheluva Narayana Swamy temple "Sri Ishwara samhita" is followed and in practice. In Tiruvellarai Sri Pundarikaksha Swamy Temple "Sri Paadma Samhita" is followed and in practice. In Tirukkudantai (kumbakONam)  Aravamudhan Sarngapani is worshipped with "Sriprasna samhita".  Rest of the places use Padma samhita or its variants. Gaudiya Vaishnavas follow  Brahma Samhita and "Naradiya Samhita".

References

Further reading
S. N. Dasgupta, A History of Indian Philosophy, vol. 3 (Delhi: Motilal Banarsidass, 1975); Sanjukta Gupta, trans., Laksmi Tantra: A Pancaratra Text.
Orientalia Rheno-Trajectina, Vol. 15 (Leiden: E. J. Brill, 1972); S. Rangachar, Philosophy of Pancaratras (Mandya: Sridevi Prakashana, 1991).
 Aiyangar, Pandit M. Duraiswami, and Venugopalacharya, Pandit T. Sri Pancaratraraksa of Sri Vedanta Desika. The Adyar Library and Research Centre, Madras, India, 1996.
 Apte, Dr. P. P. (edited). Pauskara Samhita. Rashtriya Sanskrit Vidyapeetha, Tirupati Series No.54, Tirupati, India, 1991.
 Gupta, Sanjukta. Laksmi Tantra, A Pancaratra Text. E.J.Brill, Leiden Netherlands 1972, reprint Motilal Banarsidass Publishers, Delhi, 2003.
 Krishnamacharya, Pandit V. (edited). Ahirbudhnya-Samhita of the Päncaräträgama (vol I and II). The Adyar Library and Research Centre, Madras, India, 1986.
 Matsubara, Mitsunori, Pancaratra Samhitas and Early Vaisnava Theology,  Motilal Banarsidass, New Delhi, 1994, 
 Matsubara, Mitsunori,  Monotheistic Theory of the early Vaisnavas, Vyuha Theory in the Early Pancaratra, 1990.
 Matsubara, Mitsunori,  The Formation of the Pancaratra's Theory of the Four Vyuhas, 1991.
 Otto Schrader, F., Introduction to the Pancaratra and the Ahirbudhnya Samhita,   Adyar Library, Madras 1916. Second edition 1973.
 Rangachar, S., Philosophy of Pancaratras, Sri Devi Prakashana, Mandya (Karnatak) 1991.
 Rao, S.K. Ramachandra. The Ägama Encyclopedia: Päncharäträgama. Volume IV, Sri Satguru Publications, Delhi, India, 2005.
 Sarma, Pandit K. Ramachandra (edited). Pauñkarägama. The Adyar Library and Research Centre. Madras, India, 1995.
 Siddhantashastree, Rabindra Kumar. Vaisñavism Through the Ages. Munshiram Manoharlal Publishers Pvt. Ltd., New Delhi, 1985.
 Sutton, Nicholas, Religious Doctrines in the Mahabharata, Motilal Banarsidass, New Delhi 2000.

External links
 The  Literature, Surendranath Dasgupta, 1940
 The Parama Samhita (English translation): A Pancaratra Manual, translation by Krishnaswami Aiyangar, 1940
 Pancharatra Agamas on Internet Archive

Vaishnavism